Limnonectes rhacoda is a species of frog in the family Dicroglossidae.
It is found in Indonesia and possibly Malaysia.
Its natural habitats are subtropical or tropical moist lowland forest, rivers, freshwater marshes, and intermittent freshwater marshes.
It is becoming rare due to habitat loss.

References

rhacoda
Taxonomy articles created by Polbot
Amphibians described in 1996
Taxobox binomials not recognized by IUCN